Andrea Sussi (born 23 October 1973) is an Italian professional football coach and former footballer who played as a left back. He is the head coach of Serie D club Arezzo.

Playing career
Sussi played in Serie A, Serie B, Serie C1, and Serie C2, and represented 15 different clubs, all of which were Italian. Throughout his career he was coached by the likes of notable managers, such as Franco Scoglio, Carlo Mazzone and Antonio Conte, and also played with top footballers such as Pep Guardiola, Roberto Baggio, and Luca Toni during the 2001–02 season with Brescia Calcio.

Coaching career
Following his retirement, in 2008 Sussi started his coaching career as a Technical Assistant in Reggina Calcio, Serie A, managed by Nevio Orlandi. In the following years Sussi gained experience as Head Coach in the 6th-7th  Italian tier until he was offered a position as the youth coach at U.S. Arezzo, in charge of the Juniores Nazionale squad, which he formally accepted in July 2013. After a very good season, they achieved the play-off.

In 2014/2015 Sussi was the Head Coach of Berretti in U.S. Arezzo Lega Pro.

In 2015/2016 Sussi was the Technical Director of U.S. Arezzo FA Academy.

In 2016 Sussi was admitted to a Uefa A course in Coverciano and in July 2016 he became Uefa A Coach licensed.

In 2016-17 Sussi was the Head Coach of a local team Subbiano, this allowed him to follow the Uefa A course in Coverciano.

In the 2017–18 season Sussi joined Arezzo in Lega Pro with the role of assistant coach.

On 22 November 2021, he was promoted to the position of head coach at Arezzo (now in Serie D), he returned to the club earlier in the year to manage the Under-19 squad.

Manager career

Transfers

References

1973 births
Footballers from Florence
Living people
20th-century Italian people
Italian footballers
Association football fullbacks
A.C. Cesena players
S.P.A.L. players
A.C. Perugia Calcio players
Reggina 1914 players
Genoa C.F.C. players
Brescia Calcio players
U.S. Avellino 1912 players
Ternana Calcio players
Bologna F.C. 1909 players
Serie A players
Serie B players
Serie C players
Italian football managers
S.S. Arezzo managers
Serie D managers